CGEL may refer to:

 A Comprehensive Grammar of the English Language by Quirk et al., published in 1985
 The Cambridge Grammar of the English Language by Huddleston and Pullum, published in 2002